SightSpeed is a videoconferencing company, supplying VoIP and instant messaging app for Windows and macOS operating systems.  The service allows people to make video calls, computer-to-computer voice calls, and calls to regular telephones, with free and paid versions.

In October 2008, the company was acquired by Logitech for $30 million. The Logitech Vid service is based on SightSpeed's technology. Due to competing software, the Logitech Vid video calling service will be discontinued as of 1 July 2013 and the downloading of the product has already been terminated. As a result, Logitech is no longer accepting new account registrations.

Limitations 

The main criticisms are:
 Lack of true privacy features such as encryption.
 SightSpeed "Phone Out" does not support outbound caller ID in the United States, where people commonly reject calls from unrecognized numbers.  The recipient sees "unknown" or a blank field instead of the caller ID number.
 Though it uses the SIP standard it is not interoperable with SIP networks and  can only be used with a SightSpeed account.

References

External links
 

VoIP software
Windows instant messaging clients
MacOS instant messaging clients
Videotelephony
Logitech
2008 mergers and acquisitions